"Heart Telegraph" is a song by Australian rock band Divinyls. It was released in 1986 as the final single from their second studio album What a Life!. The song was written by Christina Amphlett and Mark McEntee and produced by Gary Langan, who was one of three producers who worked on the album What a Life!.

In 1985, Divinyls scored a big hit with the song "Pleasure and Pain", which made the top twenty in Australia. They followed it up with "Sleeping Beauty" which was only a minor success and then came "Heart Telegraph", which was not successful, only peaking at number ninety on the Australian Kent Music Report singles chart.

Track listing
Australian 7" Single
 "Heart Telegraph" (Edit)
 "Guillotine Day" - 3:08

Australian 12" Limited Edition
 "Heart Telegraph" - 4:48
 "Guillotine Day" - 3:08

Charts

References

1986 singles
Divinyls songs
Songs written by Chrissy Amphlett
Songs written by Mark McEntee
1985 songs
Chrysalis Records singles